The Proton Exora is an automobile produced by Malaysian car manufacturer Proton. Considered to be a compact multi-purpose vehicle (MPV) in the C-segment, it became Malaysia's first locally developed MPV upon its release on 15 April 2009. The Exora is the first Proton to be based on the P2 platform. Its facelift revision, which debuted on 15 December 2011, became the first Proton to use the CamPro CFE turbocharged engine and CVT technology.

History

Pre-launch 

The first sketches of a Proton MPV existed as early as the 1990s. During this period, all of Proton's offerings were either saloon or hatchback vehicles. In 2001, Proton experimented with larger vehicles by introducing the Juara Mini-MPV, a rebadged Mitsubishi Town Box Wide. However, its unconventional kei car design drew criticism and it was discontinued in 2004 amidst poor sales.

The Proton MPV project was later revived in mid-2006 under the leadership of the former Proton Managing Director, Syed Zainal Abidin. The car was to be designed to suit Malaysian tastes and expectations, and was initially believed to be based on a Mitsubishi or Volkswagen platform, but Proton later confirmed that it would be built from the ground up on an all-new platform. The result was the Proton P2 platform, developed in-house by Proton with consultancy from LG CNS. On 11 February 2008, the Proton MPV was officially announced for an early 2009 launch.

Sketches of the MPV were aired on Malaysian national television on 27 May 2008, previewing its various upcoming features. From the sketches, it was initially speculated that the Proton MPV was related to a similar MPV from China's Chery, but it was later proven that there were no such relations between the two cars. Nonetheless, it was clear that various styling cues were derived from the Mitsubishi Grandis, owing to the long-standing relationship between Proton and Mitsubishi. Proton filed a patent for the upcoming MPV with the United Kingdom Intellectual Property Office (IPO) on 24 October 2008, and it was approved several days later 4 November.

The official name Proton Exora, along with its tagline Keriangan Keluarga (English: Family Fun) was announced on 17 February 2009. 'Exora', which was inspired from the Ixora flower was chosen among 251,763 entries during the Name The Proton MPV competition by the grand prize winner, Norsholihan Binti Abdul Eanich. After a development phase of 18 months, production of the Exora finally commenced in March 2009 at Proton's Shah Alam plant.

Exora (2009–2010) 

The Proton Exora was officially unveiled on 15 April 2009, becoming Malaysia's first indigenously designed MPV. It was offered in two trim variants upon its initial launch, the M-Line and H-Line respectively. Both variants were powered by the 1.6 litre CamPro CPS engine and limited to a four-speed automatic transmission.

The Exora M-Line MT was introduced on 7 July 2009, became the first Exora variant to be made available with a five-speed manual transmission.

A no frills version of the Exora was spotted undergoing testing on 22 June 2009. It later materialized into the Exora B-Line trim (known latter as standard), debuting on 19 November 2009, four days before the Perodua Alza's launch. The variant is equipped with fewer safety features is available only in manual transmission.

25th Anniversary Edition 
Proton unveiled the Exora 25th Anniversary Edition, alongside a Saga and Persona variant in July 2010.

Exora (MC) (2010–2011) 

On 15 July 2010, only just 15 months after the initial launch, Proton released the Exora MC, in which 'MC' denotes Minor Change. The car received a new body kit, chrome plated front fog light surrounds and 15-inch twin five spoke alloy rims on the exterior, whereas the interior featured darker grey trim panels and Alcantara/suede on the door panels.

Exora Bold and Exora Prime (2011–2014) 

To ensure that the Exora continues to capture the MPV segment in the Malaysian market, production of a turbocharged Exora was conceived.  It was launched on 15 December 2011 as two facelift models; the Exora Bold and Exora Prime.  The Exora Bold is available in three variants, namely the Exora Bold Executive MT, Exora Bold Executive AT and Exora Bold Premium CVT whereas the Exora Prime was only available in one, high-end luxury trim. The Exora Bold Premium and Exora Prime are powered by Proton's new CamPro CFE engine which was developed in-house by Proton and Lotus. CFE stands for 'Charged Fuel Efficiency. The facelifted Exora became the first Malaysian car to feature a turbocharged engine.

In form of new bumper, the Exora Bold Executive is the facelift model of Exora M-Line. It is still powered by Proton's non- turbocharged CamPro CPS engine.

The Exora Bold Premium shares much of its exterior and interior features with the Exora Bold Executive, but is powered by Proton's new CamPro CFE turbocharged engine and a CVT transmission.

On 11 January 2013,  Proton introduced a no frills version of the CFE powered Exora known as Proton Exora Bold 1.6 CFE Standard was launched to appeal to mass potential buyers by offering no additional accessories, but with standard CFE engine, CVT transmission and ABS + EBD, with a marginally lower price tag. It slots in between the Exora Bold Executive and Exora Bold Premium, although eventually, the Executive variant stopped its production to make way for this standard variant.

The Exora Prime is the most expensive variant available. It is technically identical to the Exora Bold Premium but offers far superior levels of luxury. The major distinguishing features of this car would be the captain seats in the second row, dual headrest LCDs and a unique color option, Absolute Brown.

Exora Bold (MC2) (2015–2017) 
Photos of facelifted Exora Bold made a circulation on social media network in December 2014. The changes merely on cosmetic aspect. The SP variant design cues reminded to the Livina X-Gear crossover hues.

There are 5 variants of the Exora Bold MC2, with a choice of either CPS or CFE engine depending on variant choice. The first 2 CPS variants are the MT and AT Standard model. The other 3 CFE variants are Executive, Premium and Super Premium (SP) which are all in form of automatic CVT transmission. The launching of MC2 also marked the reappearance of AT CPS Exora while the Exora Prime CVT model was discontinued. Three safety features those are Electronic Stability Control (ESC), rear fog lamp and two side airbags were introduced and applied for both Premium and Super Premium variants.

The 2013 to 2014 Standard CFE CVT variant specifications are identical to 2015 to 2017 Executive variant.

In 2016, the Standard CPS model was dropped and sometime between 2016 and 2017, Proton quietly discontinued the Super Premium (SP) variants leaving the Executive and Premium variants. For the first time in the Proton Exora history, the only engine choice was Proton's turbocharged CFE engine.

Exora (Enhanced) (2017–2019) 

The 2017 Proton Exora (Enhanced) was introduced on 23 July 2017 as the successor to the Exora Bold MC2. The 2017 Exora introduced mainly cosmetic changes and noise, vibration, and harshness (NVH) enhancements. The model range was also streamlined to two trim levels, namely the Executive and Executive Plus. The exterior design of the 2017 Exora has been updated to feature Proton's new three-dimensional badge, in line with the company's recently launched models.

The existing CamPro 1.6L Turbo engine and CVT powertrain has also been carried over, but it now sits on a new three-mount configuration, designed to reduce transmissions of engine vibrations into the cabin.

Exora (RC) (2019–2022) 
The 2019 Proton Exora RC (running change) was introduced on 28 May 2019. Two variants are offered: Executive and Premium. The Exora follows the Iriz and Persona with several changes in the cabin. The Premium variant meanwhile has a headunit that runs GKUI with Proton's Hi Proton voice recognition feature. However, its exterior doesn't follow the latest Proton design language though the replacement of the bee-sting antenna with a shark fin antenna and the removal of side moldings did occur.

Executive variants now shares the same Inspira like wheels as the Premium variant but only finished in single tone and the rear trim garnish is finished in chrome opposed to glossy black.

Exora (RC2) (2022–present) 
The 2023 Proton Exora (running change 2) was introduced on 19 August 2022. Two variants are offered: Executive and Premium. The exterior of the 2023 Proton Exora uses the latest logo, and both variants add on ESC as standard safety feature,  and the Premium variant upgrades its seat upholstery from semi-leatherette to full-leatherette and deletes rear fog lamp.

The engine gets a revised oil cooler hose design to fix a previously acknowledged issue where it would break prematurely.

Specifications

Powertrain 
Throughout the Proton Exora production, two engines have been available: A 1.6L naturally aspirated CPS engine and a 1.6L turbocharged CFE engine.

Suspension 
The Proton Exora uses MacPherson strut with coil spring on the front and torsion beam with coil spring for the rear.

Steering 
The Proton Exora uses a rack & pinion hydraulic power steering system and has a turning radius of 5.4 meters.

Export markets 

Proton exports the Exora to neighbour Indonesia, Thailand, Singapore, Brunei and Australia.  The Proton Exora launched in Thailand during the 2009 Thailand International Motor Expo. Despite being a newcomer and facing stiff competition from rival Japanese makes, the Exora received critical acclaim from the Thais, scoring 1,388 bookings out of a total 25,220 placed at the event. Exora is Proton's best selling car in Thailand. In 2012, Proton replaced the Exora with the new Exora CFE for the Indonesian, Thai  and Singaporean markets. The Exora CFE was previewed in Australia during the 2012 Australian International Motor Show. It will become Australia's cheapest MPV when it went on sale in mid-2013. The Exora CFE also had a planned 2012 launch in the United Kingdom, but no such launch has occurred yet.
A future launch in China and other left-hand drive markets are also anticipated, as there is evidence of left-hand drive Exora CFE testing units.

In July 2015, Proton signed a distributor agreement with Andes Motor, and the first left-hand drive Prevé and Exora evaluation units were shipped to Chile in November. The official launch of the Proton Exora in Chile was tentatively pegged at May 2016.

The Exora is also sold in Egypt with two variants: Executive and Premium. Both variants are powered by Proton's CFE engine paired to a CVT transmission. The specifications is similar to that of the Malaysian market Exora Bold (MC2). A batch of Proton cars including the Exora departed Malaysia in September 2018 and arrived in Egypt in October 2018.

Concepts 

Proton also showcased two concept models by Proton Design during the launch ceremony, the Exora Prime and Exora Prestige. The Exora Prime concept featured mostly cosmetic exterior and interior upgrades over the regular Exora, several of which made it into production two years later in the 2012 Exora Prime. The Exora Prestige variant on the other hand offered far superior levels of luxury and kit in an effort to gauge its potential as a vehicle fit for VIPs. It offered a built-in office working table, fridge and intercom, as well as a 19-inch LCD TV and a seat massaging system among others. Proton later revealed that the Exora Prestige was indeed being made and sold to selected VIPs.

On 16 July 2009, Proton showcased the Proton Exora Turbo concept at Universiti Putra Malaysia, Serdang. It housed a CamPro CPS engine fitted with various aftermarket performance parts, offering 270 hp and 350Nm of torque, a massive jump from the stock CamPro CPS engine which could only put out 125 hp and 150Nm of torque.

Proton participated in the RAC Future Car Challenge on 6 November 2011 with plug-in electric versions of the Exora, Saga and Persona, in which the company claimed two awards despite their shortcomings.

In 2015, the Proton Pick-up Concept was showcased to the public twice. This concept is based on the Exora and is reminiscent of the Proton Arena, Proton's last and only pick-up truck.

Competition 

Prior the launch of the Exora, the budget MPV segment in Malaysia was monopolized by the Toyota Avanza, Toyota Innova and Nissan Grand Livina. Unlike the Juara, the Exora was a true winner, and has since been consistently positioned among the Top 10 best selling vehicles in Malaysia.

Following the launch of the Proton Exora in April 2009, Perodua, which had also been developing a MPV since early 2008 previewed the Alza on 6 June 2009, a smaller, less powerful and thus less expensive MPV to counter sales of the Exora. Unlike Proton, which developed the Exora from scratch and kept capital outflow at a minimum, Perodua opted to simply rebadge the /(). The Perodua Alza had a planned November 2009 launch, but Proton took advantage of the delay and introduced cheaper variants of the Exora in an effort to entice potential Alza buyers. Despite Proton's best efforts, the largely cheaper Alza outsold the Exora by a significant margin, and the former replaced the latter as Malaysia's best selling MPV from 2010 and onwards.

Safety 
  - MyVAP - 
  /  - ANCAP - 

The Exora has an equivalent 4-star EuroNCAP rating after 32 Exoras were crashed at the Applus+ IDIADA crash testing facility in Spain. Additionally, the Exora was awarded a 4-star rating by Malaysia's own MyVAP evaluation program. The Exora was given a four-star ANCAP safety rating, applicable to all variants. The MPV, which is {{ya}} with dual frontal and side airbags with thorax and head protection for front occupants, scored 26.37 out of a possible 37 points. In the offset crash test, the Exora scored 10.55 out of 16 points – driver chest protection was acceptable and leg protection was marginal. In the side impact crash test, it managed 14.82 out of 16 points – driver chest protection was listed as acceptable. The Exora result – with testing carried out in July 2013 – reflected its performance in the 40% frontal offset test, where the risk of serious injury to the driver's legs was high. Side impact performance was good, but overall pedestrian test results were poor, according to ANCAP. One of the key features that made these ratings possible is the use of high tensile steel for the body cage, providing better stability and increased impact absorption during a collision. Side impact bars are also installed to reinforce the door frames and to absorb impacts from both sides.

Reception

References

Notes

External links 

Proton Exora
Exora microsite

Minivans
Exora
2010s cars
Cars introduced in 2009
Vehicles with CVT transmission
Front-wheel-drive vehicles
Compact MPVs